This is a list of seasons played by Vålerenga Fotball in Norwegian and European football, regional and test league seasons from 1915 to 1937 and national league seasons from the 1937–38 season to the most recent completed season. It details the club's achievements in major competitions, and the top scorers for some season. The statistics is up to date as of the end of the 2022 season.

This list is under construction.

References

Seasons
 
Vålerenga